Rijkens is a Dutch surname. Among variant forms are Rijk, Rijke, Rijken, Rijkes and Rijks, while the ij digraph in Dutch names is often replaced with a "y" abroad. These usually are patronymic surnames ("Rijk's son"), but occasionally may stem from rijk meaning "rich" in Dutch.  People with these surnames include:

Rijke
Pieter Rijke (1812–1899), Dutch experimental physicist
Robine Rijke (born 1996), Dutch cricketer
Sjaak Rijke (born 1960), Dutch Al-Qaeda kidnapping victim
Rijken / Ryken
Frank Rijken (born 1996), Dutch gymnast
Leland Ryken (born 1942), American Christian literary scholar
Philip Ryken (born 1966), American college president, son of Leland Ryken
Theodoor Jacobus Rijken or Brother Francis Xavier (1797–1871), Dutch Catholic missionary in the US, founder of the Xaverian Brothers in Belgium
St. Mary's Ryken High School, Maryland secondary school sponsored by the Xaverian Brothers
Rijkens
Derk Rijkens (born 1975), Dutch cricketer
Paul Rijkens (1888–1965), Dutch businessman, founding chairman of Unilever
Rijkes / Rijks
Jaap Rijks (1919–2017), Dutch equestrian
Sarah Rijkes (born 1991), Austrian racing cyclist

See also
De Rijke, Dutch surname meaning "the rich"

References

Dutch-language surnames
Patronymic surnames